The 1836 Newfoundland general election was held in 1836 in the Colony of Newfoundland. The results of the election were set aside by Henry John Boulton after he discovered some of the writs from the election had not been marked with the official seal. Some felt that this was a pretext used because Liberal reformers had dominated the assembly and a number who had been reelected in 1836 did not run for reelection the following year.

Results by party

Elected members

 Bonavista Bay District
 Robert Job Conservative
 Burin District
 John Shea Liberal
 Conception Bay District
 Robert Poole Liberal
 James Power Liberal
 Peter Brown Liberal
 Anthony Godfrey Liberal
 Ferryland District
 Patrick Morris Liberal
 Fortune Bay District
 William B. Row Conservative
 Placentia and St. Mary's District
 Patrick Doyle Liberal
 John V. Nugent Liberal
 St. John's District
 William Carson Liberal
 John Kent Liberal
 Patrick Morris Liberal
 Trinity Bay District
 Thomas C. Moore Conservative
 Fogo District
 Thomas Bennett Conservative (speaker)

Notes:
 Patrick Morris was elected in both Ferryland and St. John's

References 
 

1836
1836 elections in North America
1836 elections in Canada
Pre-Confederation Newfoundland
1836 in Newfoundland